Conchylodes platinalis is a moth in the family Crambidae. It was described by Achille Guenée in 1854. It is native to Central and South America, where it has been recorded from Venezuela, Belize, Costa Rica and Honduras.

References

Moths described in 1854
Spilomelinae